Sylhet Protidin is a major daily newspaper in Bangladesh, published from Sylhet in the Bengali language. In 2007, the paper's editor, Ahmed Noor, was arrested by the Rapid Action Battalion and allegedly tortured.  A fact finding report by human rights group Odhikar suggests that para-military forces threatened to close the newspaper down in 2007.

Notes

Bengali-language newspapers published in Bangladesh
Daily newspapers published in Bangladesh
Newspapers published in Sylhet